Amisquioumisca Lake is a freshwater body consisting of a major body of water in the Nipukatasi River, on the South Hydrographic Slope of the Broadback River, in the Municipality of Eeyou Istchee Baie-James (municipality), in the administrative region of Nord-du-Québec, in Quebec, in Canada.

The forestry is the main economic activity of the sector. Recreational
tourism activities come second.

The hydrographic slope of Amisquioumisca Lake is accessible via the James Bay Highway (North-South direction) from Matagami, passing on the west side of the lake.

The surface of Amisquioumisca Lake is usually frozen from early November to mid-May, however, safe ice circulation is generally from mid-November to mid-April.

Geography

Toponymy
In the past, the word "Amiskwumiska lake" was used to designate this body of water.

The toponym lac Amisquioumisca was formalized on December 5, 1968 at the Commission de toponymie du Québec, at the creation of this commission.

Notes and references

See also 

Eeyou Istchee James Bay
Broadback River drainage basin
Friendsquioumisca
Jamésie